Vladimir Stepanovich Kurochkin (Владимир Степанович Курочкин; 6 February 1829, Saint Petersburg, Russian Empire, - 20 April 1885, Saint Petersburg, Russian Empire) was a Russian dramatist, translator, editor and publisher. Among the plays he authored were The Green Island (as Vlad K-n, with Innokenty Omulevsky; staged in 1873, published in 1883), Who Is to Blame? (1873), Two by Two is Five (1875) and A Modiste's Diary (1875). Vladimir Kurochkin compiled and published Nevsky Sbornik (the 1867 literary compilation). He edited Iskra magazine (1864–1867) and the Tatar-language Fayde (Virtue) newspaper (1866–1870). Poets Nikolai and Vasily Kurochkins were his brothers.

References 

1829 births
1885 deaths
Editors from the Russian Empire
Writers from Saint Petersburg
Translators from the Russian Empire
Russian dramatists and playwrights
Russian male dramatists and playwrights
19th-century dramatists and playwrights from the Russian Empire
19th-century translators from the Russian Empire
19th-century male writers from the Russian Empire